Gershon Tannenbaum (19492016) was the director of the Rabbinical Alliance of America (Iggud HaRabbonim) and a longtime Jewish Press columnist (Machberes).

His Machberes column, sometimes spanning more than one page,
was subtitled "News and Views of the Yeshivish and Chasidishe World." Tannenbaum, in noting a Yartzeit, would sometimes recount the individual's life story.

He was also the rabbi of the 1924-founded B’nai Israel of Linden Heights synagogue, in Boro Park.

Tannenbaum was involved in helping victims of abuse, and his concern was reflected in his writings.

My Machberes
Tannenbaum was known for his full page detailed writings in a long-running Jewish Press featured column. When the rabbi named by an Australian newspaper's "World's oldest rabbi visits Oz" headline
 died a year later at age 106, the two line caption on the front-page photo of the funeral ended "see My Machberes."

Biography
Tannenbaum was born 1949 in a DP camp located in Windsheim, Germany. He continued the family history of service as a rabbi.

His rabbinical studies were both in Israel and the USA.

He is survived by his wife, their two sons who are rabbis, and two (married) daughters.

References

External links
 Bais Din (Religious Court), Iggud HaRabanim (Rabbinical Alliance of America) official web site

American Orthodox rabbis
American writers
1949 births
2016 deaths
21st-century American Jews